The Diamonds World Tour was the fifth concert tour by Barbadian recording artist Rihanna. It was launched in support of her seventh studio album Unapologetic (2012). The tour was announced in September 2012 following the singer's performance at the 2012 MTV Video Music Awards. The tour kicked off on March 8, 2013 in Buffalo, New York and officially ending on November 15, 2013 in New Orleans, Louisiana. The tour visited the Americas, Europe, Asia, Africa, and Australia with 96 shows in total. This was Rihanna's first Australian tour since February 2011 with The Last Girl On Earth Tour.

The set list for the concerts included songs from a selection of Rihanna's studio albums; the Diamonds World Tour includes five acts and an encore. Rihanna's outfits were designed by a variety of designers including Riccardo Tisci of Givenchy, Raf Simons of Christian Dior and Alber Elbaz, footwear was designed by French fashion line Christian Louboutin and Manolo Blahnik. The tour featured support acts including  2 Chainz, ASAP Rocky, David Guetta, and Haim among others.

The tour was met with praise from critics who noted artistic growth. Commercially, the Diamonds World Tour was a success, with extra dates added due to high demand. The tour grossed $137,982,530 (USD) from 87 shows according to Billboard magazine and was the fifth highest grossing worldwide tour of 2013. Rihanna broke numerous records during the tour, becoming the youngest artist to ever headline a sold-out show at France's National Stadium, at the age of 25. She also became the youngest artist to have sold-out shows held at Millennium Stadium (June 10, 2013) and Twickenham Stadium (June 15 & 16, 2013). In South Africa, Rihanna created history in Johannesburg at the FNB Stadium where she became the first female and youngest artist to sell out the stadium.

Background 

On September 7, following the singer's performance at the 2012 MTV Video Music Awards, she announced that she will embark on her fourth worldwide tour entitled the Diamonds World Tour, to support her then upcoming album. Rihanna's managing company Live Nation Entertainment posted a video on YouTube with the announcement of the North American dates of the tour. The tickets for the concert shows were made available a week later on September 14, 2012. She will bring her tour to 27 cities in North America during two months. On Wednesday, November 14, 2012, Rihanna revealed the European dates. The singer will tour Europe for two months between late May and late July 2013, taking in the UK during June. A few dates were announced a few days later the official European announcement although they said: more shows are expected to be announced. On March 13, 2013, the Australian dates were confirmed.

In early March 2013, via her official YouTube channel, Rihanna posted a series of videos regarding the preparations for the tour. The first video featured the dancers auditions for the tour in which contestants applied to participate on the tour. They perform several dance sequences for Rihanna and her team while they are auditioning. She posted the second video on March 2, 2013, in which the crew is preparing the outfits for Rihanna, the dancers and the backup singers. Marley Glassroth who served as a costume builder, explained that the theme of the outfits is different for every section of the show, "There is a little bit of rock n' roll, there is a little bit of sexy... everything." The stylist assistant, Jahleel Weaver, also spoke and concluded that the most difficult process of the costume creation is making "the storming ideas" reality and further described the show as "dope".

A day later, she posted a third video in which the tour crew describes how the stage will be set up for every show. The production assistant of the stage, Cody Osborne explained that he worked on it probably for over 18 million hours and he hopes it will work. Scenes are intercuted with people building the stage up together. Joe Sanchez, who serves as a production manager, stated that he started designing it since last year and it has been in construction for five weeks. He also said that it will take a team crew of over 58 people to construct and over a 100 local people crew to turn it down the stage on every show. Sanchez said that the show is more complex than the previous tours by Rihanna. On March 4, another video was posted on the singer's channel in which she rehearsal's for the dance routine of "Pour It Up" together with the choreographer. According to the latter, "this routine gives you the feeling like a stripper-slash hood choreography, that's the type of energy, that's the type where your mind will be ported." The next day, a video of the "Run Through First Look" was uploaded in which Rihanna approved the stage lighting and video content. On March 6 a video where the singer and her dancers are doing the video photo shoot was uploaded, before finally the next day, the last video where Rihanna and her crew are making the last rehearsal before leaving for the first show in Buffalo, New York was posted.

Fashion 
To support her performances, Rihanna appeared in several different outfits on the stage. The outfit for the opening of the show was created by Italian fashion designer Riccardo Tisci for Givenchy. It features a masculine oversized black printed and hand embroidered parka, which channels his signature mix of streetwear and Haute Couture. Under the parka, there was a black and white leather bra and a gold star embellishments, a sheer black silk shirt, gold embroidered satin shorts, and a gold shark tooth necklace engraved with the singer's name: "RIRI". In an interview for Women's Wear Daily, Tisci said, "Rihanna represents what young and amazing means today. She is punk and talented. She offers intelligence, energy and pure beauty. She is the face of her generation." According to a representative from Givenchy, the costume is a symbol of "female empowerment and urban haute couture elegance." Tisci further contributed to a dark floor-length black cape, a printed parka with gold bullet motifs, and an energetic pink-and-neon dress paired with holographic kicks.

Belgian fashion designer Raf Simons and the creative director at Christian Dior, also collaborated with the singer and created a sheer black dress with white Rihanna x Raf Simons text on both sides of the item paired with shorts, and white python custom Christian Louboutin boots. According to Hilary Moss of New York magazine, both the boots [cargo pants] and the sunglasses which were wore with the outfit drew inspirations from the style of the nineties. Her personal costume designer Adam Selman also designed some of the outfits including a red halter and wrap-around skirt wore for the ballads section and a red, white and yellow color-block bustier with matching leather pants and Manolo Blahnik snakeskin boots. He also designed a dollar bill hologram dress combined with metallic Pierre Hardy high-tops. The jewelry for the Adam Selman looks was designed by Lynn Ban. Regarding Rihanna, Selman spoke to New York Daily News, "Her body is so insane. It's the dream body to make clothes for. You don't have to try as hard." For the encore, Rihanna wore an Alber Elbaz created jumpsuit that made visible her chest tattoo of goddess Isis. The singer's personal stylist Mel Ottenberg, describe the outfits for the show in general as "a very Thug Life Tupac mixed with nineties candy raver".

Synopsis 

The Diamonds World Tour includes five acts and an encore. The show opens with Rihanna singing "Mother Mary" while kneeling in front of a female monument in a "prayer-like" pose. The bright lights and rich stage production start after the song, when the singer performs "Phresh Out the Runway". The show continues with a rendition of the remix of "Birthday Cake"; a performance through which Rihanna performs several sexually charged movements. For the performance of "Talk That Talk", Rihanna is joined with additional dancers and musicians. After the performances of "Pour It Up" and "Cockiness (Love It)", the singer finishes the set with a rendition of "Numb".

The second set of the Diamonds World Tour is Caribbean inspired and begins with a guitar solo performed by Nuno Bettencourt. After the solo Rihanna appears on the stage with a changed costume and performs "You da One" and "No Love Allowed". For the performance of "Man Down", a mug shot of Rihanna together with her birth name "Robyn Rihanna Fenty" appearing on the video screen. The set is followed up with a performance of her 2009 single "Rude Boy" and ends with Rihanna singing "What's My Name?". The third set of the show, features Rihanna wearing multi-colored leather pants. The set is opened with a performance of "Jump" which features dubstep bass line and pyrotechnics. After that she performs "Umbrella", "All of the Lights", "Rockstar 101" and finishes the set with the ballad "What Now" which features fire and crowd involvement in the performance.

The fourth set features Rihanna wearing a long red dress. During the set she performs a range of ballads; it starts with a performance of "Loveeeeeee Song" (Future's vocals are played in the background) and then continues with "Love the Way You Lie (Part II)". Rihanna performs a shortened version of "Take a Bow", "Cold Case Love" and finishes the set with a rendition of "Hate That I Love You". The fifth act, during which the singer wore an outfit made of money started with a performance of "We Found Love". Rihanna performs a shortened version of "S&M" while having fun in the audience, followed up by "Only Girl (In the World)" and "Don't Stop the Music". The set is finished with a performance of her 2012 single "Where Have You Been". For the encore, Rihanna gets back on the stage as she sings "a strong version" of "Stay" and finishes the concert with "Diamonds".

Commercial performance 

After the North American leg of the tour was announced, due to high demand extra dates were added in Brooklyn, Toronto and Montreal. After Rihanna announced the UK leg of the tour, pre-sale tickets searches rose by 700% on viagogo. Experts predicted that tickets for all of Rihanna's European shows could sell out in under six minutes.

Rihanna made history on May 24 at the kickoff of Morocco's annual Mawazine Music Festival by performing for a crowd of 150,000; a new record in the country's capital.
Rihanna also made history by becoming the youngest artist to ever headline a show at Paris' Stade de France, at the age of 25, stealing the distinction from Lady Gaga who performed at the stadium the year before at the age of 26. Rihanna also performed at Millennium Stadium and two times at the Twickenham Stadium on June 10, 2013 and June 15 & 16, 2013 and again became the youngest artist ever to sell out the stadiums. Istanbul's İnönü Stadium hosted Rihanna on May 30, 2013. The stadium welcomed 35,000 people for the concert, which lasted an hour and a half.

Rihanna performed to a crowd of 65,000 in Singapore during Singapore Grand Prix on Sunday September 22, 2013. It was one of the biggest concert crowds in recent history. Also, Rihanna's shows in South Africa were a commercial success. Rihanna made history on Sunday night when she became the youngest ever singer to sell out the FNB Stadium in Johannesburg. Rihanna was named the fifth-highest touring artist of 2013 by Billboard magazine, earning a gross of $137,982,530 over the course of 87 shows, of which 84 were sold out.  On Pollstars year-end chart of the top one hundred grossing worldwide tours, from January 1 to December 31, 2013, the Diamonds World Tour was placed at number six with a gross of $141.9 million from the shows that were played during the given time period. Tickets were sold with an average gross of $1,867,248 per city.

Critical reception

North America 

The tour received general acclaim during the North American legs. Mick Stingley of Billboard magazine reviewed Rihanna's performance in Hartford; according to him, the singer shined during the show. He wrote that "her interplay with her dancers and her longtime band leader Nuno Bettencourt, was a treat". Stingley concluded that with the costume and set changes, the video interludes and flashing lights, Rihanna put a "fantastic" show and was in "excellent" voice. Donnie Moorhouse of The Republican also reviewed the show and wrote that it was type of show you would expect from a Grammy star who is in a same stratosphere as singers like Alicia Keys, Beyoncé Knowles and Jennifer Lopez. "Rihanna's performance was certainly on par with the performances those stars can deliver." In a review of the concert in Chicago, Bob Gendron of Chicago Tribune stated, "Being a diva affords certain privileges. Which is why Rihanna didn't seem the least bit self-indulgent dressing up like an Egyptian princess, stomping in thigh-high boots and prancing around in the equivalent of expensive lingerie." He noted the heavy background vocals during the performance and wrote that Rihanna sang less in comparison with her previous tours, however moved more, "Her body became a blur of curves and angles—elbows, hands, legs and knees bent into various positions. Suggestive and erotic, she knows how to tease. Reviewing the concert in Detroit and writing for Detroit Free Press, Brian McCollum noted that the Diamonds World Tour is Rihanna's bid for showing 'Serious Artistic Growth. He stated that the performance, "was teeming with artsy flourishes and visual metaphor — from the Venus de Milo image behind her at show's start to the horror-film clips of 'Rockstar 101' to the stately pillars of light accompanying 'Man Down'."

The Globe and Mail'''s Brad Wheeler in a review of one of the Toronto shows wrote, "Rihanna's star is hot and still on the rise – Beyoncé's Sasha Fierce is now Sasha Fears." Natasha Paolini of HipHopCanada stated, "Since the last time I saw Rihanna live in concert, it was obvious that she has grown and matured as an artist and as an individual. I love the way she performed on this tour, she was sexy, charming and even vulnerable at times. With the exception of minor vocal slip-ups, Rihanna put on a stellar show that was tasteful, raw and fun." Mikael Wood of Los Angeles Times wrote, that "the singer inhabited each of her characters with total conviction, portraying a lifelike complexity often lost on A-list pop peers such as Katy Perry and Beyoncé." Wood praised the performance particular the rendition of "Stay" stating that the halter-top pantsuit she wore accompanied with the minimal arrangement of the song remind him of Diana Ross in her middle career. Rick Florino of Artistdirect also praised the show in Los Angeles and wrote, "In fact, she's one of the last real rockstars left, and she's owning the title like a true champ. Every tour Rihanna launches, she still manages to step up her game and best the last one. Of course, that's tradition for any rockstar worth his or her salt, but she's keeping live music exciting with mind-blowing production and tight performances."

Brenna Rushing of The Dallas Morning News similarly as other reviewers wrote, "Rihanna took full control of the surprisingly simple stage, dripping in sex appeal and belting knockout notes." She further stated that, "Rihanna treated the audience to rump-shaking sways and dance moves only a few pop stars can manage. But make no mistake, this sensual style wasn't a mask for her performance; it was just an enhancement." Rushing noted that if the fast club songs didn't catch the audience, then the ballad must did and praised their rendition. In a review of the Houston show, Joey Guerra of The Houston Chronicle stated "Rihanna sometimes emits a cold energy in videos and on record. But she comes alive onstage. There was energy and intent in every vocal lick, every hip swivel, every kick in thigh-high white boots. And that was before she even got to the big hits." Notably, Guerra praised the performances of "What Now" and the ballad set noting that nothing felt over choreographed as one moment led to another. Despite all the positive reviews during the North American leg, James Reed of Boston.com criticized Rihanna's tardiness to the Boston and the overtly use of backing tracks. However, he concluded with other critics that the ballads were her strongest moments of the night.

 Europe and Oceania 

Hannah Britt of British Daily Express reviewed Rihanna's concert at Twickenham Stadium in London stating, "Her vocals during the beautiful 'Stay' were bang on and, as a performer, she is simply captivating to watch. Whether thrusting her crotch towards the crowd, or simply standing smiling down at them, when Rihanna is in front of you, you can't take your eyes off her. Whether you agree with her morals or not, one cannot deny that the woman knows how to own a stage." Robert Copsey of Digital Spy gave the concert three out of five stars and concluded that although the concert was a "nonetheless a well-honed show that had its moments" including a 70,000 crowd singing "We Found Love" and "Only Girl (In the World)", it lacked shocking moments and spontaneity that "let her down". Manchester Evening Newss gave the first show in Manchester Arena four out of five stars and wrote, "Not only is Rihanna a rockstar, and a showbiz veteran at the tender age of 25, but a legend in her own right." In a review of the show in Cardiff, Wales, Elena Cresci of Western Mail wrote that Rihanna commands the performance as well as her multi-platinum selling colleagues and also knows what her fans want and gives it to them.

 Set list 
This set list is from the show on March 21, 2013 in Detroit. It does not represent all concerts for the tour.

"Mother Mary"
"Phresh Out the Runway" 
"Birthday Cake"
"Talk That Talk"
"Pour It Up" 
"Cockiness (Love It)" 
"Numb"
"You da One" 
"Man Down"
"No Love Allowed" 
"Rude Boy"
"What's My Name?" 
"Jump"
"Umbrella" 
"All of the Lights" / "Rockstar 101" 
"What Now"
"Loveeeeeee Song"
"Love the Way You Lie (Part II)" / "Take a Bow" / "Cold Case Love"
"Hate That I Love You" 
"We Found Love"
"S&M" / "Only Girl (In the World)" / "Don't Stop the Music"
"Where Have You Been"Encore'''
"Stay"
"Diamonds"

Shows

Cancelled shows

Personnel

Main 
 Management – RocNation
 Tour Manager – Jason Milner
 Assistant Tour Managers – Jason Geisinger, ADMG Online James Porter
 Production Coordinator – Tracy Metz
 Production Manager – Joe Sanchez
 Videographer – Evan Rodgers
 Personal Assistant – Jennifer Rosales
 Stage Manager – Roger Cabot
Automation Techs- Brian Benauer, Trevit Cromwell, Yader Mena, Seth Posner, Mike Burgess, Tom Armstong
Automation Operator- Collin Nevins, Nicholas Purciful
 Creative Direction – Willow Perron
 Stage Production – Antony Randall
 Design Director – Adam Selman
 Design Team – Marley Glassrot, Greg Kozatek, Laren Leblanc, Briana Magnifico, and Zev Schwartz
 Stylists – Mel Ottenberg and Yusef Williams
 GTA Tour Manager – Joseph Lyes

 Director of Choreography – HIHAT
 Choreographer – Troy Kirby
 Assistant Choreographers – Calvit Hodge and April Thomas
 Musical Director – Omar Edwards
 Musical Director – Adam Blackstone
 Tour Promoter – Live Nation Global Touring

Band 
 Rihanna – Lead vocals
 Nuno Bettencourt – Guitar / Band Leader
 Christopher Johnson – Drums
 Nicole Kehl – Backing vocals
 Pete Kuzma – Keyboards
 Ashley Simpson – Backing vocals
 Eric Smith – Bass
 Devine Evans;– Electronic Musician / Protools Operator / Sound Design / Digital Effects

Credits and personnel adapted from official tour book.

Notes

References 

2013 concert tours
Rihanna concert tours